The 1999 Tour de Corse (formally the 43rd Tour de Corse - Rallye de France) was the sixth round of the 1999 World Rally Championship. The race was held over three days between 7 and 9 May 1999.

Report 
Also in Corsica it was no surprise that the Citroën Xsara Kit Cars of Philippe Bugalski and Jesús Puras once again gave the World Rally Car guard a hard time. In a way, this performance proved to be even more dominant than the previous round on the Spanish tarmac, indirectly resulting in an overhaul of the regulations for next season to the detriment of FIA F2 cars. Bugalski took matters into his own hands on the opening day and did not lose his grip on the lead for the remainder of the race, allowing him to spray the winner's champagne for the second consecutive time. Puras kept up with his teammate during rally, but a single stitch here and there was not enough, despite a creditable second place, which also meant a 1-2 result for the Citroën team. This time it was Carlos Sainz who stayed closest and would complete the podium in third place. The rally also saw the debut of the Peugeot 206 WRC in the hands of François Delecour and Gilles Panizzi, where good times on special stages for both drivers preceded an early retirement.

This version of the Tour de Corse tested the format of the TV stage, the final special stage of the World Cup, which was shown live on television, giving the first three crews extra points for the drivers and builders ’championship. With the fastest crew receiving three points the second-fastest receiving two points, and the third-fastest receiving one point. Those who had retired in previous special offers also made it.

Results

References

External links 
 Results at ewrc-results.com

Tour de Corse
Tour de Corse